Lee Jong-Hwa (Hangul: 이종화, born July 20, 1963) is a former South Korean football player and coach.

Playing career 
He played in K-League side Hyundai Horang-i and Cheonan Ilhwa Chunma in South Korea.

Lee's pro debut was against Hanil Bank FC on March 8, 1986 for Hyundai Horang-i. In his first season, he played three games. He announced his retirement when the 1986 season ended. After he retired from football, he ran a bakery, but he was recalled by Kim Ho the new manager of Hyundai Horang-i in 1988. From 1989, he played again in the K-League for Hyundai Horang-i. In 1991, he moved to Ilhwa Chunma. Lee won the K-League winner title for the third consecutive time with Ilhwa Chunma.

International career 
He was a participant at 1994 FIFA World Cup as a member of South Korea, but never played in a tournament.

Club career statistics

Honours

Hyundai Horangi
 Korea Professional Championship (1): 1986

Ilhwa Chunma
 K-League
 Winner (3): 1993, 1994, 1995
 Runner-up (1): 1992
 K-League Cup (Adidas Cup)
 Winner (1): 1992
 Runner-up (1): 1995
 AFC Champions League (1): 1995-96
 Asian Super Cup (1) : 1996

Individual
 K-League Best XI (2) : 1992, 1993

References
The Legends of K-League : ‘그라운드’위의 사령관 - 이종화 ①  
The Legends of K-League : ‘그라운드’위의 사령관 - 이종화 ②

External links
 K-League Player Record 
 FIFA Player Statistics
 

1963 births
Living people
Association football defenders
South Korean footballers
South Korea international footballers
Ulsan Hyundai FC players
Seongnam FC players
K League 1 players
1994 FIFA World Cup players
People from Tongyeong